Acraea odzalae is a butterfly in the family Nymphalidae. It is found in the Republic of the Congo. For taxonomy see Pierre & Bernaud, 2014

References

Butterflies described in 1997
odzalae
Endemic fauna of the Republic of the Congo
Butterflies of Africa